The Best of the Decca Years is a compilation of The Kingston Trio's recordings when the group was on the Decca Records label.

Reception

Writing for Allmusic, music critic Cub Koda wrote of the album; "Although painted as a quaint coffeehouse group from the hootenanny days of folk music's history, the Kingston Trio actually had pretty big ears for a wide variety of material, ranging from pop to obscure Broadway material, to songs from up-and-coming folk artists they had originally influenced... this collection shines a light on a part of the group's history usually ignored, and shows that much good music emerged during their final days."

Track listing
 "Stay Awhile" (Nick Reynolds, Bob Shane, John Stewart) – 2:15
 "Long Time Blues" (Mason Williams) – 2:21
 "Love's Been Good to Me" (Rod McKuen) – 3:09
 "Poverty Hill" (Fred Hellerman, Fran Minkoff) – 3:24
 "My Ramblin' Boy" (Tom Paxton) – 3:46
 "Three Song" (Williams) – 2:10
 "I Can't Help But Wonder Where I'm Bound" (Paxton) – 2:40
 "Rusting in the Rain" (McKuen) – 2:46
 "They Are Gone" (Williams) – 2:46
 "Lei Pakalana" (Samuel F. Omar) – 2:16
 "Children of the Morning" (Stewart) – 2:42
 "Hit and Run" (Stewart) – 2:16
 "Less of Me" (Glen Campbell) – 2:25
 "Lock All the Windows" (Stewart) – 3:17
 "Gonna Go Down the River" (Dallas Frazier, Buddy Mize) – 2:04
 "I'm Going Home" (Fred Geis) – 2:24

Personnel
Bob Shane – vocals, guitar, banjo
Nick Reynolds – vocals, tenor guitar, bongos, conga
John Stewart – vocals, banjo, guitar, harmonica
Dean Reilly – bass

Production notes
Frank Werber – producer
Todd Everett – reissue producer

References

The Kingston Trio albums
1998 greatest hits albums